Zaman Anwar is a Pakistani professional wrestler. He won gold at the 2016 South Asian Games and won a silver medal at the 2022 Commonwealth Games. He participated at the 2014 Commonwealth Games.

References

Pakistani male sport wrestlers
Living people
1991 births
Commonwealth Games silver medallists for Pakistan
Wrestlers at the 2014 Commonwealth Games
Wrestlers at the 2022 Commonwealth Games
Commonwealth Games medallists in wrestling
South Asian Games gold medalists for Pakistan
South Asian Games medalists in wrestling
Sportspeople from Gujranwala
20th-century Pakistani people
21st-century Pakistani people
Medallists at the 2022 Commonwealth Games